HMCS Hochelaga was a commissioned patrol vessel of the Royal Canadian Navy (RCN) that served in World War I and postwar until 1920. Hochelaga is a historic name associated with Canada, the voyages of Jacques Cartier, and the city of Montreal. Initially constructed as the yacht Waturus (alternatively spelled Walrus or Waterus) in 1900 in Europe, the vessel was sold to an American in 1902. The ship was acquired in 1914 for use as a patrol vessel on the East Coast of Canada. Following World War I, the vessel became a ferry between Prince Edward Island and Nova Scotia. After World War II the ship was renamed HaChayal Ha'Ivri and used for illegal Jewish immigration to Palestine. The vessel was scrapped in 1950.

Design and description
The vessel was initially constructed as a yacht with a clipper bow. In Canadian naval service, the ship displaced  and mounted one 12-pounder gun.

Service history
Launched at Leith, Scotland by Hawthorn & Company in 1900, the ship was originally named Waturus, and was owned by Charles Stephen, the Archduke of Austria. The archduke sold the vessel to Randal Morgan, an American, in 1902 for $150,000 and Morgan paid a further $40,000 to refit the yacht. Morgan took part in yacht races with Waturus along the East Coast of the United States.

During World War I, the Royal Canadian Navy (RCN) sought suitable vessels for patrol service along the East Coast of Canada following warnings of increased U-boat activity. Finding few available in Canada, the RCN sent agents south to the United States to acquire ships. The RCN sent Aemilius Jarvis to acquire two yachts in New York City in July 1915. Waturus, which was for sale by the shipbrokers Cox & Stevens for $80,000 in 1914, was one of the two Jarvis acquired for the RCN. The ship was renamed Hochelaga, commissioned on 13 August 1915, and sailed to Montreal for conversion to an armed yacht. Hochelaga arrived at Sydney, Nova Scotia in September for duty on the Atlantic coast as a patrol vessel. The vessel was part of the East Coast patrol from 1916 to 1918. The ship was present in Halifax Harbour during the Halifax Explosion and suffered damage, with several crew members injured in the blast.

On 21 August 1918 Hochelaga, while performing an anti-submarine patrol with a small flotilla of four ships off the coast of Nova Scotia, encountered the German submarine  while the submarine was in the process of boarding and sinking Canadian fishing schooners. The commanding officer of Hochelaga, Lieutenant R.D. Legate, ordered the ship to turn and head back towards the flotilla instead of intercepting the enemy. For failing to confront the enemy, Lieutenant Legate was placed under arrest and court-martialled in Halifax in October. Legate was found guilty and dismissed from the service. Hochelaga remained on the Atlantic patrol until the end of the war and remained in RCN service until 1920. The ship was briefly reactivated for active duty in July 1919 for the visit of the Prince of Wales to Canada and carried several guests, among them Admiral Sir Charles Kingsmill and the Governor General of Canada, along the St. Lawrence and Saguenay Rivers. In October 1919 Hochelaga was sent to tour the lighthouses and ship radio stations along the coasts of the Gulf of St. Lawrence and Newfoundland. Hochelaga was paid off on 30 October 1920 and put up for sale. The vessel was not sold until 23 February 1923 when John Simon of Halifax acquired the vessel.

In 1923 Hochelaga, operated by Hochelaga Shipping and Towing Co., of Halifax, became a Pictou–Charlottetown ferry. It was sold again in 1942 to Thomas C. Wilwerth of New York, who attempted to change the vessel's coal-fired steam engines to modern oil-burning ones at Sullivan Shipyard in Brooklyn. When the US government took over the yard as part of the war effort, Wilwerth was forced to move the vessel on his own, but this proved too difficult and he took Hochelaga to Todd Shipyards to complete the conversion. It was during this period that the United States Coast Guard inspected the vessel and found several plates needed to be replaced and the number of crew increased to 24. On 3 July 1943, the vessel was seized by the United States Marshals Service due to unpaid bills. Hochelaga was in turn sold to a subsidiary of the United Fruit Company for use in the sugar trade with Puerto Rico. The United Fruit Company sold the vessel at the end of the war.

Between 1945 and 1946, the vessel's record becomes difficult to track, but the ship reappeared in 1946 registered to Em. Fostinis of Marseille and flagged in Honduras. Operated by Cra Mar. Las Palmas the vessel was renamed HaChayal Ha'Ivri and used in a 1946 attempt to carry Jewish immigrants to Palestine (now known as Israel), at the time controlled by the British. Departing Antwerp on 14 July 1946 and carrying some 550 passengers, she was seized off Haifa by the British destroyer . The vessel was taken to Cyprus and remained listed to 1953, but the ultimate fate of the vessel is unknown.

References

Notes

Citations

Sources

External links
 Converted civilian vessels
 Ships of the Aliyah Bet

Armed yachts of the Royal Canadian Navy
Jewish immigrant ships
1900 ships
Auxiliary ships of the Royal Canadian Navy